Rade Šerbedžija (born 27 July 1946) is a Croatian actor, director and musician. He is known for his portrayals of imposing figures on both sides of the law. He was one of the best known Yugoslav actors in the 1970s and 1980s. He is internationally known mainly for his role as Boris the Blade in Snatch, his supporting roles in such Hollywood films as The Saint, Mission: Impossible 2, X-Men: First Class, Harry Potter and the Deathly Hallows: Part 1,  and Taken 2; and for his recurring role as former Soviet Army General Dmitri Gredenko in Season 6 of TV action series 24.

Šerbedžija’s work has earned widespread acclaim and accolades. He is a four-time recipient of the Golden Arena for Best Actor, Croatia’s highest filmmaking honors. He won the Critics Award for Best Actor at the 51st Venice International Film Festival for his performance in Before the Rain (1994). His performance in the Canadian film Fugitive Pieces (2007) was nominated for a Genie Award and Satellite Award. He was awarded the International Press Academy’s Mary Pickford Award, an honorary award “for Outstanding Artistic Contribution to the Entertainment Industry”, in 2019. The same year, he won his second Vladimir Nazor Award for “Lifetime Achievement - Film Art”.

Early life
Šerbedžija was born in the village of Bunić in the Lika region of Croatia, then part of Yugoslavia. His parents were ethnic Serbs who fought in the Second World War as Partisans. Šerbedžija was raised as an atheist.

Career in Yugoslavia
In 1969, he graduated from the Academy of Dramatic Arts of the University of Zagreb and then worked as a theatre actor in the City Drama Theatre Gavella and at the Croatian National Theatre in Zagreb. While still a student, Šerbedžija started to play leading roles in films and theatre productions. His stage roles included Oedipus and Richard III. His performance as Hamlet in 1974 in Dubrovnik catapulted him into stardom.

Šerbedžija landed his first major film role in 1968 in the Branko Ivanda-directed Gravitation. He had various notable roles in Yugoslav films, among others in Bravo maestro (1978), Journalist (1979), Banović Strahinja (1981), Kiklop (1982) and San o ruži (1986). He was also among the leading actors in several TV series, such as in Prosjaci i sinovi (1971), U registraturi (1976), and Putovanje u Vučjak (1986).

Šerbedžija taught as a professor at the University of Zagreb from 1979 to 1981 and at the University of Novi Sad from 1987 to 1991.

Šerbedžija was one of the most well-known actors in Yugoslavia, in addition to being one of the most beloved. Prior to leaving his home country, Šerbedžija had starred in over 40 films. He was also one of the main supporters of the KGPT Yugoslav theater, a project initiated to unite the different Yugoslav state theaters into a single troupe.

Šerbedžija is a four-time recipient of the Golden Arena for Best Actor at the Pula Film Festival; in 1978 for Bravo maestro, in 1986 for Evening Bells (Večernja zvona), in 2010 for 72 Days (Sedamdeset i dva dana), and Fishing and Fishermen's Conversations (2020).

In 2000, Šerbedžija founded the Ulysses Theater with Borislav Vujčić on the Brijuni islands. In a co-production between the Ulysses Theatre and the National Theatre in Belgrade, for his role in the 2019 adaptation of Who's Afraid of Virginia Woolf?, Šerbedžija received the Zoran Radmilović Award, the Croatian Theatre Award for Best Actor in a Leading Role, and the Orlando Award.

International career

As war broke out in Yugoslavia, Šerbedžija initially moved to Serbia in 1992, then Slovenia before eventually spending some time in London, England at the invitation of actor and friend Anthony Andrews. While in London, Šerbedžija met with Macedonian-American director Milcho Manchevski who cast him in his 1994 film Before the Rain. The performance earned him a Critics Award for Best Actor at the Venice Film Festival.

Prior to leaving Yugoslavia, Šerbedžija appeared in two films that were released in the West; Hanna's War (1988) and Manifesto (1988).

Šerbedžija has had supporting roles in Hollywood films such as Mission: Impossible 2, Mighty Joe Young, The Saint, Eyes Wide Shut, Snatch, and Space Cowboys among others. He is usually known for playing villains.

He had a cameo in Batman Begins; he was asked to reprise his cameo role in The Dark Knight, but declined.

In 2001, he starred in a television production of Rodgers and Hammerstein's musical South Pacific as French plantation owner Emile de Becque. He also appeared in the BBC spy-thriller show Spooks for one episode as a villain. In 2005 he played Captain Blake in Rupert Wainwright's remake of The Fog, and had a supporting role in the NBC science fiction series Surface. In 2007 he played Athos Roussos in Jeremy Podeswa's feature film adaptation of Anne Michaels' novel Fugitive Pieces.

His performance in the Canadian film Fugitive Pieces (2007) was nominated for a Genie Award and Satellite Award for Best Supporting Actor.

He portrayed Dmitri Gredenko on the sixth season of the hit Fox show 24.

In 2009 Šerbedžija was cast in Harry Potter and the Deathly Hallows – Part 1 as the famous foreign wandmaker Gregorovitch. In 2014, Šerbedžija appeared in six episodes of Downton Abbey as Prince Kuragin, a Russian exile and long-ago lover of the Dowager Countess Violet Crawley, portrayed by Dame Maggie Smith.

Other work
Šerbedžija is also known for his poetry readings and music. He has released four poetry books and four music albums. He recorded the award-winning ballad "Ni u tvome srcu" with Bosnian vocalist Kemal Monteno. While in London, Šerbedžija stayed at actress Vanessa Redgrave's residence and the two became friends. With Redgrave, Šerbedžija founded the Moving Theatre Company.

In 2017, Šerbedžija signed the Declaration on the Common Language of the Croats, Serbs, Bosniaks and Montenegrins.

Personal life
Šerbedžija married Ivanka Cerovac in 1969. They have a son, film director Danilo (b. 1971), and a daughter, actress Lucija (b. 1973). The couple divorced in 1987.

Šerbedžija met his second wife, Lenka Udovički, the sister of Serbian politician Kori Udovički, in Subotica in 1990 and they married in 1991. With his second wife, he has three daughters: Nina, Vanja, and Mimi. The girls grew up in London during their early years, then moved to California due to their father's acting career.

Šerbedžija's parents left Vinkovci as Serb refugees for Belgrade in 1991, due to the Croatian War of Independence.

In 1992, while at a club in Belgrade, an intoxicated youth swore at Šerbedžija, calling him "Serb traitor", then shot his gun in the air. The youth himself was from Lika, as was Šerbedžija. Šerbedžija took his wife and at the time, only daughter Nina, and left Zagreb and Belgrade, and settled in Ljubljana, Slovenia. Šerbedžija has called himself "Yugo-nostalgic", and in 2011, said that times were better in Socialist Yugoslavia than now. Šerbedžija owns property in London, Hollywood, California, Rijeka, and Zagreb. As of January 2011, he reportedly spends most of his time in Rijeka together with his wife Lenka.

Šerbedžija is a citizen of Croatia, North Macedonia, and Slovenia.

Filmography

Film

Television

Awards and nominations

References

External links

1946 births
Living people
People from Udbina
Serbs of Croatia
Croatian male film actors
Croatian male stage actors
Croatian male television actors
Croatian expatriates in the United States
Yugoslav male film actors
English-language singers from Croatia
Yugoslav male stage actors
Yugoslav male television actors
Golden Arena winners
Croatian Theatre Award winners
Zoran Radmilović Award winners
20th-century Croatian male actors
21st-century Croatian male actors
Signatories of the Declaration on the Common Language